Lihie Raz (born 14 September 2003) is an American-born Israeli artistic gymnast. She won the bronze medal on the floor exercise at the 2020 European Championships which is Israel's first medal at the European Women's Artistic Gymnastics Championships. She is also the 2019 and 2021 Israeli all-around champion. She represented Israel at the 2020 Summer Olympics and finished fifty-ninth in the all-around during qualifications, but did not advance to any finals.

Early life
Raz was born in New York City to Israeli parents Tami and Nitzan Raz, and she immigrated with them to Israel in 2003 when she was three months old. She grew up in Ramat HaSharon and is Jewish. She began gymnastics when she was six years old under coach Moran Klefner, who is still coaching her today.

Career

2017–2018 
At the 2017 Maccabiah Games, Raz made her international debut and won the gold medal on the floor exercise with a score of 11.775. She placed fifth in the all-around at the 2018 Junior Israeli Championships. She was selected to compete at the 2018 Junior European Championships where the Israeli team finished twenty-third. Then at the 2018 Voronin Cup, she placed tenth in the all-around, fourth on vault, eight on the uneven bars and balance beam, and sixth on the floor exercise.

2019 
Raz made her senior international debut at the Austrian Team Open where she placed eighth in the all-around and fourth with the Israeli team. Then at the Stella Zakharova Cup, she won the bronze medal on the floor exercise behind Angelina Radivilova and Farah Ann Abdul Hadi, and she placed fourth on the vault. She placed sixth in the vault final at the 2019 Osijek World Cup. At the Israeli Championships, she won her first national all-around title with a total score of 46.350.  Then at the World Championships, she finished eighty-second in the all-around which qualified her for the 2020 Olympics.

2020–2021 
At the 2020 European Championships, Raz won the bronze medal in the floor exercise event final with a score of 12.750 behind Turkey's Göksu Üçtaş Şanlı and Romania's Larisa Iordache. This made her Israel's first ever medalist at the European Women's Artistic Gymnastics Championships. Additionally, she was the third reserve for the vault final after finishing eleventh in the qualification round.

In February, Raz won the bronze medal in the all-around at the 2021 Israeli Winter Cup. She then qualified for the all-around final at the 2021 European Championships and finished twenty-second with a total score of 47.499. She won her second national all-around title at the 2021 Israeli Championships. She then represented Israel at the 2020 Summer Olympics and finished fifty-ninth in the all-around during the qualification round with a total score of 50.399.

Awards 
Raz was selected for Forbes Israel 30 Under 30 list for 2021.

See also
List of Jews in sports

References

External links
 
 
 

Living people
2003 births
Competitors at the 2017 Maccabiah Games
Competitors at the 2022 Maccabiah Games
Israeli female artistic gymnasts
Gymnasts at the 2020 Summer Olympics
Maccabiah Games gold medalists for Israel
Maccabiah Games medalists in gymnastics
World Games bronze medalists
Olympic gymnasts of Israel
Israeli Jews
American emigrants to Israel
Israeli people of American-Jewish descent
American people of Israeli descent
Sportspeople from New York City
Jewish gymnasts
Jewish sportswomen